The Tamil Filmfare Best Lyricist Award is given by the Filmfare magazine as part of its annual Filmfare Awards for Tamil films.

The award was first given in 2005.

Superlatives

Multiple Wins

4 wins :Na Muthukumar
3 wins :Vairamuthu, Thamarai

Multiple Nominations
12 nominations :Vairamuthu 
11 nominations :Na Muthukumar 
10 nominations :Madhan Karky 
 8 nominations :Thamarai
5 nominations :Vivek 
3 nominations :Yugabharathi 
2 nominations :Pa. Vijay, Kabilan, Vignesh Shivan,Karthik Netha

Winners
Here is a list of the award winners and the films for which they won.

Nominations

2008: Thamarai – "Nenjukkul Peithidum" – Vaaranam Aayiram
 Na. Muthukumar – "Mudhal Mazhai" – Bheema
 Thamarai – "Kangal Irandal" – Subramaniapuram
 Vaali – "Kallai Mattum" – Dasavathaaram
 Vairamuthu – "Vaa Vaa" – Abhiyum Naanum

2009: Na. Muthukumar – "Vizhi Moodi" – Ayan
 Ilaiyaraaja – "Piychai Paathiram" – Naan Kadavul
 Kabilan – "Karikaalan" – Vettaikaaran
 Thamarai – "Oru Vetkam" – Pasanga
 Vairamuthu – "Nenje Nenje" – Ayan
 Viveka – "Chinna Thamarai" – Vettaikaaran

2010: Thamarai – "Mannipaaya" – Vinnaithaandi Varuvaayaa
 Na. Muthukumar – "Aval Apaadi" – Angadi Theru
 Na. Muthukumar – "Vamma Duraiyamma" – Madrasapattinam
 Vairamuthu – "Kadhal Anukal" – Enthiran
 Vairamuthu – "Usure Pogudhey" – Raavanan

2011: Vairamuthu – "Saara Saara" – Vaagai Sooda Vaa
 Madhan Karky – "Nee Korinaal" – Nootrenbadhu
 Na. Muthukumar – "Mun Andhi" – 7aum Arivu
 Na. Muthukumar – "Vizhigalil Oru" – Deiva Thirumagal
 Thamarai – "Engeyum Kadhal" – Engeyum Kadhal

2012: Yugabharathi – "Solitaley" – Kumki
 Madhan Karky –  "Veesum" – Naan Ee
 Madhan Karky – "Google Google" – Thuppakki
 Na. Muthukumar – "Kaatrai Konjam" – Neethane En Ponvasantham
 Vairamuthu – "Para Para" – Neerparavai

2013: Na. Muthukumar – "Anandha Yaazhai" – Thanga Meengal
 Madhan Karky – "Anbin Vaasale" – Kadal
 Na. Muthukumar – "Yaaro Ivan" – Udhayam NH4
 Vairamuthu – "Chithirai Nila" – Kadal
 Vairamuthu – "Sengaade" – Paradesi

2014: Na. Muthukumar – "Azhagu" – Saivam
 Madhan Karky – "Selfie Pulla" – Kaththi
 Pa. Vijay – "Yaarumilla" – Kaaviya Thalaivan
 Vairamuthu – "Ovvondrai Thirudigarai" – Jeeva
 Yugabharathi – "Manasula Soora Kaathu" – Cuckoo

2015: Madhan Karky – "Pookale satru" – I  
 Kabilan – "Ennidu Nee Irundhal" – I
Thamarai – "Unakenna Venum Sollu" – Yennai Arindhaal  
Vignesh Shivan – "Thangamey" – Naanum Rowdy Dhaan 
Vivek – "Vaadi Rasatthi" – 36 Vayadhinile 

2016: Thamarai – "Thalli Pogathey" – Achcham Yenbadhu Madamaiyada  
Arunraja Kamaraj – "Nerupudaa" – Kabali
Madhan Karky – "Naan un azhaginile" – 24
Vairamuthu – "Endha pakkam" – Dharmadurai 
Vivek – "En Suzhali" – Kodi

2017: Vairamuthu- "Vaan varuvaan" – Kaatru Veliyidai 
Madhan Karky – "Azhagiye" – Kaatru Veliyidai
Madhan Karky – "Idhayame" – Velaikkaran
Vivek – "Aazhaporaan Tamizhan" – Mersal 
Vivek – "Neethane" – Mersal

2018: Karthik Netha – "Kaadhalae" – 96
 GKB – "Vaayadi Petthapulla" – Kanaa
 Madhan Karky – "Kurumba" – Tik Tik Tik
 Vignesh Shivan – "Sodakku" – Thaana Serndha Kootam
 Vivek – "Pottakati Poovasam" Pariyerum Perumal

2020-2021: Arivu – Neeye Oli – Sarpatta Parambarai
 Karthik Netha – "Idhuvum Kadandhu Pogum" – Netrikann
 Ko Sesha – "Kadhaippoma" – Oh My Kadavule
 Thamarai – "Yaar Azhaippadhu" – Maara
 Uma Devi – "Aarariro" – Kadaseela Biriyani
 Yugabharathi – "Kaiyilea Aagasam" – Soorarai Pottru

References

Lyricist